is a Prefectural Natural Park in northeast Ehime Prefecture, Japan. Established in 1961, the park is wholly situated within the municipality of Shikokuchūō. The park's central feature is the eponymous .

See also
 National Parks of Japan

References

External links
  Detailed map of Kinshako Prefectural Natural Park

Parks and gardens in Ehime Prefecture
Shikokuchūō
Protected areas established in 1961
1961 establishments in Japan